Told by an Idiot are a British theatre company which specialises in devised and physical theatre. Following their 1995 Edinburgh Fringe Festival debut, the group, also known as The Idiots, continue to create comedies based on bleak source material. Throughout their career, the outfit’s core members Hayley Carmichael, Paul Hunter and John Wright collaborated with The Royal Shakespeare Company, Scottish actor Richard Wilson, and poet laureates Carol Anne Duffy and Simon Armitage.

History
Paul Hunter and British actress Hayley Carmichael formed the company with their former drama teacher John Wright after graduating from Middlesex Polytechnic in 1993.

The outfit debuted at the Edinburgh Fringe Festival with a play inspired by Gabriel Garcia Marquez’ One Hundred Years of Solitude. Hunter and Carmichael’s debut offering titled, On the Verge of Exploding received a nomination for the Independent Theatre Award. Subsequently, the London International Mime Festival hosted the play at their annual event in London.

In 1995 the outfit created a play inspired by Emir Kusturica’s film, Time of the Gypsies titled, I’m So Big. The adaptation which John Wright described as ‘a brutally comic fable’, aired at the Battersea Arts Centre. I’m so Big told the story of Romani brothers: Maximo and Fredo who kidnap a prostitute to survive. Actor and director, Hayley Carmichael played Lady, the kidnapped prostitute.

Their fourth production, I Weep at My Piano, reinforced the troupe’s favourable position amongst theatre goers. Northern Stage commissioned the show in 1998 for the Lorca Festival in Newcastle upon Tyne. The production, a tribute to the Spanish playwright Federico García Lorca, a contemporary of Salvador Dalí and Luis Bunuel addressed Lorca’s untimely death with theatrical absurdity set to a melancholic soundscape. 

The cohort’s version of Argentinian Julio Llinas short story and film, Shoot Me in the Heart played at the Gate Theatre in Notting Hill. Llinas’ fairy tale about Andrea, a nomadic bachelor who falls in love with Carlotta, an adult woman who stopped growing at the age of seven, revealed both physical theatre’s limitations and strengths. Told in the cohort’s esoteric style, the actors played the parts of horses, bells and garden gnomes. The production divided opinion, “This is as much a celebration of theatrical possibility as of prejudice-confounding love. It delights in subverting expectations, in stylising reactions and in overlapping scenes, absurdly.” Art critic Michael Billington pointed out that the plot relies heavily on the passage of time which did not come across in the troupe’s rendering.

Style
Both Carmichael and Hunter admit that their spontaneous approach often verges on the chaotic. Carmichael cites Jacques Lecoq and his Parisian school of physical theatre as an overarching influence on the outfit’s theatrical style, with one difference; Lecoq favoured style and technique, while The Idiots seek out stories. Additionally, they often eschew psychology for ‘lazoo’ a Commedia dell’arte term for a comic routine.

The actors gravitate towards bleak source material, and tonal tension characterises much of their work. They combine hard thinking with tomfoolery and handle difficult topics with irreverence. For example, they took a romp-style look at Alzheimer's disease and terrorist groups.

Collaborations
The troupe occasionally collaborates with poets, writers and jazz musicians.

The company’s first collaboration with a writer, Happy Birthday, Mr Deka D by Nigerian Novelist Biyi Bandele proved challenging for the thespians, who previously shunned theatre’s scripted format for devised theatre.

The company struck a partnership with screen actor and theatre director Richard Wilson for their production of the Presnyakov Brothers’ black comedy Playing the Victim. Wilson, known for his sensitive, psychological character-led approach was an unusual pairing for Told By an Idiot, who claim to use scripts rarely, or as Carmichael puts it, "We just jump right in at the deep end and make loads of stuff up." To complicate matters, The Presnyakov Brothers relied upon Sasha Dugdale, a Russian to English translator to communicate in English. On paper, the brother’s play, a comedy about a heroine who stars in reconstructions of lurid crimes seemed like a fertile common ground for the physical theatre cohort and the One Foot In The Grave lead. While Told by an Idiot adapted their approach to the demands of scripted performance, Wilson admitted to not changing his habits to suit his collaborators. Meanwhile, Presnyakov Brothers, operating under the belief that they are not real writers, but just playing at being writers were reportedly unaffected by the difference in creative approaches allowing the director and company to redact large parts of their opus. 

The play’s reviews varied. Critic Michael Billington described it as “a play that feels like Orton's Loot without the concomitant wit”. However, crime writer Ian Rankin, speaking on the BBC’s Newsnight described the production as, “one of the best ensemble pieces I've seen for a long time.” 

Former poet laureate Carol Anne Duffy collaborated with the company for their fictional account of Giacomo Casanova’s life. Unlike the original 18th century writer and Italian, Duffy and Told by an Idiot’s protagonist of the same name retained the promiscuity that led historians to revere Casanova. However, they changed Casanova’s sex to female, thus rendering her vulnerable to pregnancy, physical abuse and declining beauty. The comedy’s jokes included the protagonist giving birth on London bridge and giving her child away to George III; and Casanova having sex with a monk in several different positions whilst a seagull looks on.

The Fahrenheit Twins
The Fahrenheit Twins was an adaptation of Michel Faber’s story of two identical twins living in an arctic exploration station. The siblings’ anthropologist parents, preoccupied with monitoring a local tribe, fail to see that their children have developed survival rituals of their own. The twins believe they can ward off change by blinding an arctic fox every year before the creature witnesses the first snow of the season.

The Firework-Maker’s Daughter
In 2004, the troupe adapted Sir Philip Pullman’s novella The Firework-Maker’s Daughter. The production explores themes of maturity, happiness and independence through the story of a girl wishing to follow in her father’s footsteps and become a firework maker despite her father’s desire to marry her off. The company’s rendition combined the fairy-tale-like aspects of Pullman’s novella with pantomime humour. The production debuted in Sheffield with Carmichael cast as the lead. Initially, some criticised the show for its slowness, diffusiveness and self-indulgence. However, later performances condensed the production to two hours, including an interval.

My Perfect Mind
The company’s first two-hander My Perfect Mind based on Edward Petherbridge’s experience of suffering a stroke whilst preparing to play the lead role in William Shakespeare’s King Lear. Despite the stroke leaving Petherbridge partially paralysed, he could remember King Lear's script in its entirety.

Actor Kathryn Hunter directed the ninety-minute performance which relied heavily on slapstick, Anglocentric farcical stylings and a tilted stage. Petherbridge played himself, while Paul Hunter played a series of fall guys such as a German neurologist,  Romanian Shakespeare professor and the English actor Laurence Olivier. Based on real-life events, the story recalls the circumstances leading up to Petherbridge’s stroke, his rehabilitation and 2010 west-end comeback. The performance blended autobiographical re-enactments of Petherbridge’s life with recitals from King Lear, theatrical in-jokes and metaphysical posits about old age, and the human mind and body's resilience.

I Am Thomas
The 2016 production titled I Am Thomas, a collaboration with current poet laureate Simon Armitage, told the story of Scottish Student Thomas Aikenhead and his execution for blasphemy in 1697. The play’s central theme is freedom of speech and its title referenced Je Suis Charlie in a show of solidarity with the murdered Charlie Hebdo cartoonists. While not directly referencing the Charlie Hebdo Shooting, the work depicts Aikenhead as a free-speech martyr. Director Paul Hunter claims that instead of a liberal, atheist attack on religion, the play was primarily concerned with tolerance and acceptance.

Napoleon Disrobed
In 2018, the company adapted Simon Leys’ Novella Napoleon Disrobed, an alternative history of Napoleon Bonaparte’s last days. Paul Hunter played Napoleon, while Ayesha Antoine played the supporting characters. The 80-minute production speculated about what might have happened had Napoleon escaped exile in St Helena in modern times.

Productions

References

Theatre companies in London